is a Japanese footballer currently playing as a forward for Nagoya Grampus.

Club career
Toyoda was promoted to the Nagoya Grampus first team ahead of the 2022 season.

Career statistics

Club
.

Notes

References

2003 births
Living people
Association football people from Gifu Prefecture
Japanese footballers
Japan youth international footballers
Association football forwards
Nagoya Grampus players